The Komfo Anokye Teaching Hospital also known as GEE for it heavy equipments (KATH) in Kumasi, Ashanti Region, Ghana, is the second-largest hospital in Ghana, and the only tertiary health institution in the Ashanti Region.

History
It was the main referral hospital for the Ashanti, Brong Ahafo and northern regions of Ghana until then Tamale Regional Hospital was upgraded to Teaching hospital hence handling referrals from Northern, Upper East and Upper West regions thereby easing some pressure on it.

The hospital was built in 1954, as the Kumasi Central Hospital. It was later named Komfo Anokye  Hospital after Okomfo Anokye, a legendary fetish priest of the Ashanti.  It is said that Anokye placed an unmovable sword in the middle of the Ashanti empire. Many have tried and failed to remove the sword. In 1996, the Okomfo Anokye Sword Site was built around the sword on the grounds of the hospital.

The hospital was converted into a teaching hospital in 1975 affiliated to the medical school of the Kwame Nkrumah University of Science and Technology. The hospital is also accredited for postgraduate training by the  West African College of Surgeons in surgery, obstetrics and gynaecology, otorhinolaryingology, ophthalmology and radiology.  The hospital currently has about 1000 beds, up from the initial 500 when first built.

The latest building added to Komfo Anokye Hospital was the National Accident and Emergency Centre.

In October 2019, the first surgery on a heart at the hospital without making an incision was performed successfully.

In November 2019, the hospital received four awards at the 2019 Ghana Procurement and Supply Chain Awards. The awards were for Excellence in Procurement and Supply Chain (silver category), Public Procurement and Supply Chain Compliance (silver category), Procurement and Supply Chain Team of the year (Bronze category).

In March 2022, the hospital received a donation of 100 beds from Ghana Oil Company Limited (GOIL) to enhance the access of beds by patients.

Directorates 
The hospital has clinical and non-clinical directorates.

The clinical directorates include:
 Anaesthesia and Intensive Care Unit (ICU)
Child Health
Oral health
 Eye, Ear, Nose and Throat (EENT)
 Diagnostics
 Medicine
Obstetrics & Gynaecology
 Oncology
 Family Medicine 
Surgery
 Accident and Emergency department
Pharmacy
Physiotherapy
Laboratory

The non-clinical directorates include:
 Domestic Services
Security
 Supply Chain Management
 Technical Services

National Accident and Emergency Centre 
The constructions of the National Accident and Emergency Centre started in 2004 and were completed in 2008. The whole project was carried out by Hospital Engineering GmbH and GerTech GmbH from Germany. The project was done as a Turn-Key Project, including planning, designing, project development, construction works and implementation as well as provision and installation of medical and technical equipment.

The following departments exist:
 Laundry
 Central Stores
 Mortuary
 Medical Gas Bottles Store
Blood Bank
 Blood Donor Services
 Haematology
 Microbiology
 Biochemistry
 Parasitology
 Observation Wards
 Resuscitation Area
 Pharmacy
 First Aid Bays
 Radiology
 ICU
 Wards
 CSSD
 Operating Theatre Department
Burns Unit
 Administration

A specific feature of the National Accident and Emergency Centre is an ultramodern facility for Forensic Medicine.

Missing baby scandal
On February 5, 2014 Suwaiba Abdul Mumin was admitted to the hospital for the birth of her baby. She was informed that the baby was stillborn and when she asked to see the body, she was told it could not be found. The bodies of four other children pronounced stillborn by the hospital that day were also missing. The suspicious "vanishing of babies" made headlines with some suggesting an ongoing illegal baby selling business by midwives and hospital authorities. Seven people were charged but given bail on February 27, 2014. Minister of Health Sherry Ayitey placed the doctor and midwife, as well as the Chief Executive Officer of the hospital, on indefinite leave. She went ahead to propose a Ghc 50,000 compensation which was rejected by the Suweiba and her family who still maintain that the baby is alive.

Notes

Hospital buildings completed in 1954
Hospitals in Ghana
Hospitals established in 1954
Kwame Nkrumah University of Science and Technology